Carminow is an Anglo-Cornish surname, sometimes spelled Carminowe

It may refer to:
John Carminow or Carminowe ( – 1592), MP
Nicholas Carminow or Carminowe ( – 1569), MP
Oliver Carminow or Carminowe (died 1597), MP
 A family from Cornwall who were involved in the Scrope v. Grosvenor controversy with the Scrope and Grosvenor families about their coat of arms

Anglo-Cornish surnames